Selaginella serpens is a species of plant in the family Selaginellaceae: found mostly in the Caribbean.

References

serpens